Melson is a surname. Notable people with the surname include:

Boyd Melson, American boxer
C.W. Melson (1929–1981), American politician
Charles L. Melson (1904-1981), American admiral
Isaac Melson Meekins (1875–1946), U.S. federal judge
Joe Melson (born May 1935), American singer and songwriter
Kenneth E. Melson (born c. 1948), American lawyer and acting ATF Director
Robert Melson (political scientist), professor emeritus of political science and Jewish studies at Purdue University
Silas Melson (born 1996), American basketball player

See also
Melsons Corner, unincorporated community in El Dorado County, California